is a city located in Saitama Prefecture, Japan. , the city had an estimated population of 344,194 in 163,675 households and a population density of 4800 persons per km².

Geography
Tokorozawa is located in the central part of the Musashino Terrace in southern Saitama, about 30 km west of central Tokyo. Tokorozawa can be considered part of the greater Tokyo area; its proximity to the latter and lower housing costs make it a popular bedroom community. The Higashikawa and Yanasegawa rivers that flow from the Sayama Hills flow to the eastern part of the city, and finally reach the Arakawa River. The Yamaguchi Reservoir (commonly known as Lake Sayama) is mostly located within city boundaries; Lake Tama also touches the south-western part of the city.

The area around Tokorozawa Station's west exit is built up as a shopping district with several department stores.  Prope Street is a popular shopping arcade.

Surrounding municipalities
 Saitama Prefecture
 Iruma
 Niiza
 Sayama
 Kawagoe  
 Miyoshi  
Tokyo Metropolis
 Kiyose
 Higashimurayama
 Higashiyamato
 Musashimurayama
 Mizuho

Climate
Tokorozawa has a humid subtropical climate (Köppen Cfa) characterized by warm summers and cool winters with light to no snowfall.  The average annual temperature in Tokorozawa is 14.0 °C. The average annual rainfall is 1647 mm with September as the wettest month. The temperatures are highest on average in August, at around 25.7 °C, and lowest in January, at around 2.3 °C.

Demographics
Per Japanese census data, the population of Tokorozawa has recently plateaued after several decades of strong growth.

History
Archaeological research has shown that the vicinity of Tokorozawa was settled from about 20,000 years ago. Tokorozawa Shinmei Shrine has a traditional establishment of 110 AD. Hatogamine Hachiman Shrine is believed to date from 921 AD. During the Kamakura period, the Kamakura Kaidō ran through the area and the area was host to a series of battles fought in May 1333 that were part of the Genko War that ultimately ended the Kamakura Shogunate. These include the 1333 Battle of Kotesashi and the Battle of Kumegawa. Kotesashi was again the site of another battle nineteen years later. During the Edo period (1603–1867) the area's major industry was sericulture. It was also an important trading center, being located at the intersection of roads connecting Edo with the towns of Hachioji, Chichibu, Kawagoe and Fuchu.

The town of Tokorozawa was created within Iruma District, Saitama with the establishment of the modern municipalities system on April 1, 1889.

Tokorozawa became the site of Japan's first air base and air service academy in 1911. The base was used through the end of World War II and fell under the control of the United States Armed Forces after the war. The US returned most of its property in Tokorozawa to Japan in 1971, but retains a communications facility in the city which is operated by the 374th Airlift Wing of the Fifth Air Force, based at Yokota Air Base to the southwest. The facility houses antennas for communications with USAF aircraft in the region. Much of the land returned to Japan has been converted into the public Tokorozawa Aviation Memorial Park.

Tokorozawa was elevated to city status on November 3, 1950. In 1955, Tokorozawa annexed the neighboring villages of Yanase and Mikajima, and assumed its present boundaries. The development of large scale public housing and railroad development led to a rapid population increase in the 1960s. Tokorozawa was the site of the Clay pigeon shooting event in the 1964 Tokyo Olympics.

Tokorozawa was designated as a special city with increased local autonomy in 2002. It currently meets the conditions to be designated as a core city but has yet to receive this designation.

Government
Tokorozawa has a mayor-council form of government with a directly elected mayor and a unicameral city council of 34 members. Tokorozawa contributes four members to the Saitama Prefectural Assembly. In terms of national politics, the city is part of Saitama 8th district of the lower house of the Diet of Japan.

Economy

Public sector
Tokorozawa houses the Tokyo Area Control Center, which controls airspace in the Kantō, Jōetsu, Tōhoku, Chūbu, and Hokuriku regions and a portion of the Kansai region.

Private sector
Tokorozawa is the headquarters of Seibu Holdings, the parent company of Seibu Railway and Tokorozawa Station forms a hub in the Seibu Railway network which serves western Tokyo and southern Saitama. Tokorozawa is at the intersection of Seibu's two main lines, which respectively run to Ikebukuro Station and Seibu Shinjuku Station in central Tokyo. Several Seibu group companies, including its railway and bus divisions, are headquartered in the vicinity of Tokorozawa Station. Seibu owns an amusement park, baseball stadium (Seibu Prince Dome) and velodrome (Seibu-en Velodrome) in the "Seibu-en" district near Lake Tama in the southwestern corner of the city.

Citizen Holdings operates a watch factory in Tokorozawa.

Education
Akikusa Gakuen Junior College
Waseda University – Tokorozawa campus
College of Art, Nihon University – Tokorozawa campus
In addition the prefecture also operates two special education schools for the handicapped.

Prefectural high schools:

Transportation

Railway

 JR East – Musashino Line
Higashi-Tokorozawa Station
 Seibu Railway - Seibu Ikebukuro Line 
 -  -  - 
 Seibu Railway - Seibu Shinjuku Line 
 -  - 
 Seibu Railway - Seibu Sayama Line 
 -  - 
 Seibu Railway - Seibu Yamaguchi Line 
 -

Highway

Twin towns and sister cities
Tokorozawa is twinned with:
 Decatur, Illinois, United States from May 6, 1966
 Changzhou, Jiangsu, China from April 20, 1992
 Anyang, Gyeonggi, Republic of Korea from April 17, 1998

Local attractions

Professional sports teams
 Saitama Seibu Lions (baseball, Belluna Dome)
 Saitama Broncos (basketball, Tokorozawa Municipal Stadium)

General points of interest

 Belluna Dome: home of the Seibu Lions
 Seibu-en: amusement park
 Sayama Ski Slope: indoor ski and snowboard resort 
 Tokorozawa Aviation Museum: the location of Japan's first airfield.
 Tokorozawa Civic Cultural Centre Muse: public auditorium and concert hall
 Arahata Fuji Shrine: Shinto Shrine that is a scale reproduction of Mount Fuji offering views of the latter
 Hachikokuyama: nature park famous for being the inspiration of Totoro
 Kurosuke no ie: office of Totoro fund
 Futagoyama stable: stable of professional sumo wrestlers
 Kadokawa Culture Museum: New multiple museum building designed by Kengo Kuma at  Tokorozawa Sakura Town. It features the permanent outdoor art instillation "Resonating Life in the Acorn Forest" by TeamLab as well as a double-height 8 meter tall library housing fifty thousand plus volumes which can morph into a ‘bookshelf theater’ via projection mapping.

Historical points of interest
 Battle of Kotesashi: site of an important battle during the Genko War
 Tokorozawa Shinmei Shrine: believed to have been founded in the second century A.D.
 Shinko-ji: A Buddhist temple that was established during the Kamakura period
 Waterfall Castle: a Sengoku Period castle ruin
 Hatogamine Hachiman Shrine: an ancient Shinto shrine including a 13th-century main shrine building
 Sayama Fudōson: important temple of Tendai
 Konjoin: "Yamaguchi Kanon" Since 810-824

Events
The Tokorozawa Matsuri is a festival held each year in October and features traditional Japanese parade floats ( mikoshi ), taiko drums, and samba dancers.

A two-day festival featuring music, cultural and sports exhibitions, community group activities and food booths takes place in late October in Kokukoen Park on the grounds of the former airfield. A similar 1-day festival, the Shimin Bunka Fair, takes place in early April in the park.

The city and local business community decorates the west side of Tokorozawa station with holiday lights from early December through mid March, and separate lighting ceremonies featuring local musicians, politicians, and sports figures are conducted for various portions of the lighted areas.

Notable people from Tokorozawa

Bokuzen Hidari (1894–1971), actor born in Kotesashi Village (which was absorbed into Tokorozawa)
George Tokoro (Real Name: Takayuki Haga, Nihongo: 芳賀 隆之, Haga Takayuki), comedian, TV personality, singer-songwriter and essayist
Yoshiharu Habu, professional shogi player
Toshiaki Kasuga, comedian
Hokutōfuji Daiki, sumo wrestler (Real Name: Daiki Nakamura, Nihongo: 中村 大輝, Nakamura Daiki)
Chisato Okai, Japanese idol and former member of the idol group C-ute
Naoto, Japanese idol, dancer, rapper and member of the groups Exile and Sandaime J Soul Brothers (Real Name: Naoto Kataoka, Nihongo: 片岡直人, Kataoka Naoto)
Yoshiji Soeno, Japanese karateka and former kickboxer (welterweight)

Tokorozawa in popular culture
Tokorozawa inspired the setting for the animated film My Neighbor Totoro (Tonari no Totoro).
In the light novel series Sword Art Online, much of the story is based in Tokorozawa. 
Scenes in the Japanese film Shall We Dance? were set in Tokorozawa. The Seibu Ikebukuro Line's Sayamagaoka Station features in the film.
Scenes in the Japanese horror film Ju-on were filmed in Tokorozawa. The area around Tokorozawa Station is identifiable.

References

External links

Official Website 

 
Cities in Saitama Prefecture